Bassiknou  is a town and commune in the Hodh Ech Chargui Region of south-eastern Mauritania.

In 2013 it had a population of 10,561.

References

Communes of Hodh Ech Chargui Region